Anthony Magnacca (born 9 April 1978) is an Australian retired soccer player who played as a midfielder. He played in the Norwegian Premier League, his first professional stint, in 2001.

Career

On trial with SK Brann of the Norwegian Premier League in 2001, Magnacca saw Brann as a springboard to a higher league upon transferring to the club and was received well, earning a salary of about 30000 krone per month. He then made his league debut opposing Bodø/Glimt, in which Brann lost 5–1, after being praised by the coach for his assiduous efforts in a friendly. The Australian's debut would be his only appearance in his loan to Norway which lasted just two months.

References

External links 
 
 MA Profiles at OzFootball

Living people
1978 births
Australian people of Italian descent
Australian soccer players
Soccer players from Melbourne
Association football midfielders
Eliteserien players
Caroline Springs George Cross FC players
Canberra Cosmos FC players
South Melbourne FC players
Newcastle Jets FC players
SK Brann players
Green Gully SC players
Preston Lions FC players
Hume City FC players
Heidelberg United FC players
FC Bulleen Lions players
Australian expatriate soccer players
Australian expatriate sportspeople in Norway
Expatriate footballers in Norway